Ceryx lamottei is a moth of the subfamily Arctiinae. It was described by Sergius G. Kiriakoff in 1963. It was described from Nimba.

References

Ceryx (moth)
Moths described in 1963